Gittin' to Know Y'All is a various artists album recorded during the annual Baden-Baden Free Jazz Meeting in 1969 and released on the MPS label in 1970. It features one track by the Baden-Baden Free Jazz Orchestra conducted by trumpeter Lester Bowie, one by the Terje Rypdal Group, one by Karin Krog, and one by The Willem Breuker-John Surman Duo. This historic session was the first time that many of these European and American jazz musicians performed together in a large group setting.

Reception
The Allmusic review awarded the album 3 stars.

Track listing
 "Gittin' to Know Y'All" (Bowie) -  32:00
 "Ved Soerevatn" (Rypdal) - 5:00
 "For My Two J.B.'s" (Krog) - 1:06
 "May Hunting Song" (Breuker) - 4:47
Recorded live during the annual Baden-Baden Free Jazz Meeting at Südwestfunk UKO Studio I on December 12 to 14, 1969.

Personnel
Track 1 - The Baden-Baden Free Jazz Orchestra conducted by Lester Bowie
Lester Bowie: trumpet and conductor
Hugh Steinmetz: trumpet
Kenny Wheeler: trumpet
Albert Mangelsdorff: trombone
Eje Thelin: trombone
Joseph Jarman: soprano saxophone
Roscoe Mitchell: alto saxophone
Alan Skidmore: tenor saxophone
Heinz Sauer: tenor saxophone
Gerd Dudek: tenor saxophone
Bernt Rosengren: tenor saxophone
John Surman: baritone saxophone
Willem Breuker: bass clarinet
Terje Rypdal: guitar
Dave Burrell: piano
Leo Cuypers: prepared piano
Barre Phillips: bass
Palle Danielsson: bass
Steve McCall: drums
Tony Oxley: drums
Claude Delcloo: drums
Track 2 - The Terje Rypdal Group
Terje Rypdal: guitar
Claude Delcloo: bells
Joseph Jarman: flute
Bernt Rosengren: flute, oboe
Karin Krog: vocals
Barre Phillips: bass
Palle Danielsson: bass
Steve McCall: drums
Track 3 - Karin Krog
Karin Krog: vocals
Track 4 - The Willem Breuker-John Surman Duo 
John Surman: bass clarinet
Willem Breuker: bass clarinet

References

1970 albums
MPS Records albums
Lester Bowie albums
Albums produced by Joachim-Ernst Berendt